This is a list of museums in Cape Verde.

Museums in Cape Verde

Fogo
São Filipe Municipal Museum

Santiago
Museu Etnográfico da Praia, Praia
Museu da Tabanca, Chã de Tanque
Tarrafal camp, Chão Bom

São Vicente
Centro Nacional de Artesanato e Design, Mindelo

See also 

 List of museums

External links 	

Museums
 
Museums
Cape Verde
Museums
Cape Verde